The George F. "Buddy" Sasser Cup Trophy (usually just called the Sasser Cup) is a trophy awarded annually to the top athletic program in the Big South Conference. Formally called The Commissioner's Cup, it was renamed The Sasser Cup after former commissioner Buddy Sasser.

History
Annual Sasser Cup champions

 1985–86: Winthrop
 1986–87: Winthrop
 1987–88: Coastal Carolina
 1988–89: Coastal Carolina
 1989–90: Coastal Carolina
 1990–91: Coastal Carolina
 1991–92: Campbell
 1992–93: Campbell
 1993–94: Campbell
 1994–95: UNC Greensboro
 1995–96: UNC Greensboro
 1996–97: UNC Greensboro
 1997–98: Liberty
 1998–99: Liberty
 1999–00: Liberty
 2000–01: Coastal Carolina
 2001–02: Liberty
 2002–03: Liberty
 2003–04: Coastal Carolina
 2004–05: Coastal Carolina
 2005–06: Coastal Carolina
 2006–07: Coastal Carolina
 2007–08: Liberty
 2008–09: Liberty
 2009–10: Liberty
 2010–11: Liberty
 2011–12: Liberty
 2012–13: Liberty
 2013–14: Coastal Carolina
 2014–15: Coastal Carolina
 2015–16: Liberty
 2016-17: Liberty
 2017-18: Liberty
 2018-19: Campbell
 2019-20: None Awarded (Covid-19)
 2020-21: Campbell

References

College sports trophies and awards in the United States
Big South Conference